Groomsport Football Club is a Northern Irish junior-level football club playing in Division 2C of the Northern Amateur Football League in Northern Ireland. The club was founded in 1975 as Groomsport Old Boys, changing to the current name in 1992. Its home ground is The Meadow in Groomsport, County Down.

Staff and board members
 President :  Walter Graham, Billy McAneney
 Vice-President:  Paul O'Kane
 Chairman:  Ian Patton
 vice-chairman: Nigel McKernan 
 Secretary :  Gareth Caldwell 
 Treasurer :  
 Committee Member :  Andy McFarland
 Committee Member :  Ally McIntyre
 Committee Member :  David Williams
 Committee Member :  Alex oNeill
 Committee Member :  Robbie Milling

Honours

Junior honours
NAFL Division 2B:
1999/00 2003/04
NAFL Division 2C:
1998/99

External links
 Groomsport Official Club website
 nifootball.co.uk - (For fixtures, results and tables of all Northern Ireland amateur football leagues)

Notes

Association football clubs in Northern Ireland
Association football clubs established in 1975
Association football clubs in County Down
Northern Amateur Football League clubs
1975 establishments in Northern Ireland